UFC 203: Miocic vs. Overeem was a mixed martial arts event produced by the Ultimate Fighting Championship held on September 10, 2016, at the Quicken Loans Arena in Cleveland, Ohio.

Background
This was the first UFC event in Cleveland.

The event was headlined by a UFC Heavyweight Championship bout between current champion (and Cleveland area native) Stipe Miocic against 2010 K-1 World Grand Prix winner and former Strikeforce Heavyweight Champion Alistair Overeem.

The professional debut of former professional wrestler CM Punk took place at this event. Punk, who signed with the UFC in December 2014, had a delayed debut due to past injuries from professional wrestling that needed treatment and also due to his need for training time. He made his debut against Mickey Gall in a welterweight bout.

Ben Rothwell was expected to face former heavyweight champion Fabrício Werdum at this event. However, on August 11, Rothwell pulled out due to injury. A team representative said he may have suffered a torn meniscus and could have an ACL injury. He was replaced by Travis Browne. This was a rematch as Werdum defeated Browne via unanimous decision at UFC on Fox: Werdum vs. Browne in 2014.

A lightweight bout between Erik Koch and Drew Dober was originally booked for UFC 195, but Koch pulled out due to an injury and the bout was scrapped. The fight was later rescheduled for this event, until Koch pulled out again due to injury and was replaced by promotional newcomer Jason Gonzalez.

Mairbek Taisumov was expected to face Nik Lentz at the event. However, Taisumov was removed from the fight on September 1 for alleged visa issues and replaced by promotional newcomer Michael McBride.

On September 5, it was announced that the lightweight bout between Damir Hadžović and Yusuke Kasuya, slated to open the preliminary portion of the card, was postponed and will now take place at October's UFC Fight Night: Lamas vs. Penn after Hadžović experienced issues with his travel visa.

Ray Borg was scheduled to face Ian McCall at the event. However, Borg pulled out of the fight on September 7 citing an illness. With no time to find a suitable replacement, McCall was removed from the card.

Michael McBride missed weight, coming in at 158 lb. As a result, he was fined 20% of his fight purse, which went to his opponent Nik Lentz.

On the day of the event, C.B. Dollaway was forced out of his bout against Francimar Barroso due to a back injury he sustained in a malfunctioning elevator at his hotel. As a result, Barroso was also removed from the event.

Results

Bonus awards
The following fighters were awarded $50,000 bonuses:
Fight of the Night: Stipe Miocic vs. Alistair Overeem
Performance of the Night: Jéssica Andrade and Yancy Medeiros

Reported payout
The following is the reported payout to the fighters as reported to the Ohio Athletic Commission. It does not include sponsor money or "locker room" bonuses often given by the UFC and also do not include the UFC's traditional "fight night" bonuses. The total disclosed payout for the event was $3,056,000.

Stipe Miocic: $600,000 (no win bonus) def. Alistair Overeem: $800,000
Fabrício Werdum: $375,000 (includes $125,000 win bonus) def. Travis Browne: $120,000
Mickey Gall: $30,000 (includes $15,000 win bonus) def. CM Punk: $500,000
Jimmie Rivera: $48,000 (includes $24,000 win bonus) def. Urijah Faber: $160,000
Jéssica Andrade: $46,000 (includes $23,000 win bonus) def. Joanne Calderwood: $25,000 
Bethe Correia: $50,000 (includes $25,000 win bonus) def. Jessica Eye: $25,000
Brad Tavares: $56,000 (includes $28,000 win bonus) def. Caio Magalhães: $20,000
Nik Lentz: $76,000 (includes $38,000 win bonus) def. Michael McBride: $12,000 ^ 
Drew Dober: $38,000 (includes $19,000 win bonus) def. Jason Gonzalez: $10,000
Yancy Medeiros: $48,000 (includes $24,000 win bonus) def. Sean Spencer: $17,000

^ Michael McBride was fined 20 percent of his purse for failing to make the required weight for his fight with Nik Lentz. That money was issued to Lentz, an OAC official confirmed.

See also
List of UFC events
2016 in UFC

References

Ultimate Fighting Championship events
Events in Cleveland
2016 in mixed martial arts
Mixed martial arts in Ohio
Sports in Cleveland
2016 in sports in Ohio
September 2016 sports events in the United States